José Guzmán Santos (born 19 March 1947) is a Mexican politician affiliated with the Institutional Revolutionary Party. As of 2014 he served as Deputy of the LIX Legislature of the Mexican Congress representing Oaxaca.

References

1947 births
Living people
Politicians from Oaxaca
Institutional Revolutionary Party politicians
Instituto Politécnico Nacional alumni
20th-century Mexican politicians
21st-century Mexican politicians
Members of the Congress of Oaxaca
Deputies of the LIX Legislature of Mexico
Members of the Chamber of Deputies (Mexico) for Oaxaca